Dear Friend: Madrasta is a 2009 Philippine television drama series broadcast by GMA Network. It is the fourth installment of Dear Friend.

Plot
Madrasta tells the story of two women whose lives are intertwined by shades of intrigue, personal ambitions and resentment.

Gellie (Iwa Moto) is often misjudged as a flirtatious, easy to get type of girl by her schoolmates. Unknown to them, Gellie is trying to cope with her harrowing experience as a battered girlfriend.

During these trying times, she finds comfort in the arms of Arnold (Gary Estrada), the owner of the school where she studies. On one occasion, Shiela (Yasmien Kurdi) chances upon Gellie talking to Arnold and immediately gives the wrong impression that Gellie toys with older men. She brands Gellie as a gold-digger.

Gellie and Arnold start seeing each other and, despite their age difference, they fall in love instantly. However, things get complicated on the day of their engagement. Gellie discovers that Shiela is Arnold's daughter, her former classmate who spread the false rumors about her.

Cast and characters

Lead cast
Yasmien Kurdi as Sheila
Iwa Moto as Gellie
Gary Estrada as Arnold
Marco Alcaraz as Lino

Supporting cast
Kevin Santos as Bernard
Dang Cruz as Nino

References

2009 Philippine television series debuts
2009 Philippine television series endings
Filipino-language television shows
GMA Network drama series
Television shows set in the Philippines